Janeth Morón Villarroel (born 2 June 1988) is a Bolivian footballer who plays as a forward for Mundo Futuro and the Bolivia women's national team. She is also a futsal player, who appeared at the 2017 Copa América Femenina de Futsal for Bolivia.

Early life
Morón hails from the Santa Cruz Department.

Club career
On 18 August 2019, Morón won the Simón Bolívar Women's Cup playing for Mundo Futuro-Oriente Petrolero, scoring twice, and through that victory the team qualified for the 2019 Copa Libertadores Femenina.

International career
Morón represented Bolivia at the 2006 South American U-20 Women's Championship. At senior level, she played in three Copa América Femenina editions (2006, 2014 and 2018).

International goals
Scores and results list Bolivia's goal tally first

References

External links

1988 births
Living people
Women's association football forwards
Bolivian women's footballers
People from Santa Cruz Department (Bolivia)
Bolivia women's international footballers
Bolivian women's futsal players